Javier Heraud Pérez (1942–1963) was a Peruvian poet and member of the Ejército de Liberación Nacional (ELN). In his early life he studied at Markham College and later he continued his studies at Pontifical Catholic University of Peru.

In January 1963, a group led by the 21-year-old poet Javier Heraud and Alain Elías crossed through Bolivia, where they picked up weapons, and entered southern Peru. Plagued by Leishmaniasis infection however, the 15 member team decided to enter the city of Puerto Maldonado to seek out medical supplies. The local police were warned of the group's advance, and on May 15 Heraud was shot in the chest and killed while he drifted past the town in a dugout canoe.

Publications 
 El río (1960)
 El viaje (1961) 
 Estación reunida (1961)

Work published in anthologies 
 Ricardo Silva Santisteban (anthologist): Antología general de la traducción en el Perú (General anthology of translation in Peru). Lima, Universidad Ricardo Palma - Editorial Universitaria, 2016.

References

External links 
 Biography and selected poems 
  
 Javier Heraud at "Literature peruana" 
 "Biography of a Lost Poet".  Time (May 31, 1963).

1942 births
1963 deaths
Writers from Lima
20th-century Peruvian poets
Peruvian male poets
Peruvian translators
Peruvian people of French descent
National University of San Marcos alumni
Pontifical Catholic University of Peru alumni
Peruvian communists
20th-century translators
English–Spanish translators